Princess Benedikte of Denmark, Dowager Princess of Sayn-Wittgenstein-Berleburg  (Benedikte Astrid Ingeborg Ingrid, born 29 April 1944) is a member of the Danish royal family. She is the second daughter and child of King Frederick IX and Queen Ingrid of Denmark. She is the younger sister of the reigning Queen of Denmark, Margrethe II, and the older sister of Queen Anne-Marie of Greece.

Princess Benedikte often represents her elder sister at official or semi-official events. She and her late husband, Richard, 6th Prince of Sayn-Wittgenstein-Berleburg, had three children. Princess Benedikte is currently 11th in the line of succession to the Danish throne.

Early life

Birth and family

Princess Benedikte was born on 29 April 1944 at Frederik VIII's Palace, her parents' residence at the Amalienborg palace complex, the principal residence of the Danish royal family in the district of Frederiksstaden in central Copenhagen. She was the second child and daughter of Crown Prince Frederick of Denmark and Crown Princess Ingrid née Princess Ingrid of Sweden. Her father was the eldest son of King Christian X of Denmark and Queen Alexandrine née Duchess Alexandrine of Mecklenburg-Schwerin; and her mother was the only daughter of Crown Prince Gustav Adolf of Sweden (later King Gustav VI Adolf of Sweden) and his first wife Crown Princess Margaret née Princess Margaret of Connaught.

Her birth took place during Nazi Germany's Occupation of Denmark. The day after the birth of the princess, members of the Danish resistance group Holger Danske performed a salute of 21 bombs in the Ørstedsparken public park in central Copenhagen as a reference to the traditional 21-gun salute performed by the Danish Army and Navy at the occasion of royal births.

She was baptised on 24 May 1944 in the Holmen Church in Copenhagen. Her godparents were King Christian X and Queen Alexandrine (her paternal grandparents), Prince Gustav of Denmark (paternal grand-uncle), King Gustav V of Sweden (maternal great-grandfather), Prince Sigvard, Duke of Uppland (maternal uncle), Princess Caroline-Mathilde of Denmark (paternal aunt-by-marriage), Princess Ingeborg of Denmark (paternal grand-aunt), Princess Margaretha of Sweden (her father's first cousin), Sir Alexander Ramsay (maternal grand-uncle) and Queen Elizabeth of the United Kingdom.

Princess Benedikte has one elder sister, Margrethe, present Queen of Denmark, and a younger sister, Anne Marie, who was born in 1946 and married Constantine II of Greece.

Childhood and education

Princess Benedikte and her sisters grew up in apartments at Frederick VIII's Palace at Amalienborg in Copenhagen and in Fredensborg Palace in North Zealand. She spent summer holidays with the royal family at her parents' summer residence at Gråsten Palace in Southern Jutland. On 20 April 1947, King Christian X died and Benedikte's father ascended the throne as King Frederick IX.

At the time of her father's accession to the throne, only males could ascend the throne of Denmark. As her parents had no sons, it was assumed that her uncle Prince Knud would one day assume the throne. The popularity of Frederick IX and his daughters and the more prominent role of women in Danish life paved the way for a new Act of Succession in 1953 which permitted female succession to the throne following the principle of male-preference primogeniture, where a female can ascend to the throne if she has no brothers. Benedikte's elder sister Margrethe therefore became heir presumptive, and Princess Benedikte and Princess Anne-Marie became second and third in the line of succession.

Princess Benedikte was educated at N. Zahle's School, a private school in Copenhagen, followed by stays at a boarding school (Benenden School) in England and a Swiss finishing school. In 1965 she took a class at the Margrethe-Skolen, a private fashion and design school in Copenhagen.

Marriage

Benedikte was married on 3 February 1968 at Fredensborg Palace Church to Richard, 6th Prince of Sayn-Wittgenstein-Berleburg (1934–2017). They had three children:

Prince Gustav (born 12 January 1969).

Princess Alexandra (born 20 November 1970).

Princess Nathalie (born 2 May 1975).

The King had decreed that Princess Benedikte's children would need to be raised in Denmark in order to have succession rights. Since the condition was not met, Princess Benedikte's three children are not in line to succeed to the throne. The children of Princess Benedikte are styled as Highnesses by a Danish Order in Council.

Interests
Princess Benedikte is very much involved in the Scout/Guide organization in Denmark as well as internationally. When she was a child, a special Scout unit was created, so that she could join the Guides. Now her involvement is more at the organisational level as she is chairman for Pigespejdernes Fællesråd Danmark (Joint Committee of Girl Guides in Denmark). She is patron of De grønne pigespejdere (The Green Girl Guides, Denmark) and Det Danske Spejderkorps (The Danish Guide and Scout Association). In addition she is patron of the Olave Baden Powell Society (OB-PS), a support organisation for the World Association of Girl Guides and Girl Scouts.
She is an honorary member of the St George's Guilds in Denmark. In 2007 she was awarded with a prize of honour by this Scout association for adults.

She is also involved in equestrian sport, and has acted as an honorary patron of the World Breeding Federation for Sport Horses. In 2006, she ran in an election for president of the International Equestrian Federation, but she was heavily defeated, earning only 16 votes and placing last out of the three candidates.

Titles, styles, honours and awards

As Princess of Denmark, Benedikte is entitled to the style "Her Royal Highness".

Honours

National
 : Knight of the Order of the Elephant (R.E.)
 : Knight Grand Commander of the Order of the Dannebrog (S.Kmd.)
 : Dame of the Royal Family Decoration of King Christian X
 : Dame of the Royal Family Decoration of King Frederik IX
 : Dame of the Royal Family Decoration of Queen Margrethe II
 : Recipient of the Cross of Honour of the Order of the Dannebrog (D.Ht.)
 : Recipient of the Homeguard Medal of Merit
 : Recipient of the 100th Anniversary Medal of the Birth of King Christian X
 : Recipient of the 50th Anniversary Medal of the Arrival of Queen Ingrid to Denmark
 : Recipient of the 50th Birthday Medal of Queen Margrethe II
 : Recipient of the Silver Anniversary Medal of Queen Margrethe II and Prince Henrik
 : Recipient of the Silver Jubilee Medal of Queen Margrethe II
 : Recipient of the 100th Anniversary Medal of the Birth of King Frederik IX
 : Recipient of the Queen Ingrid Commemorative Medal
 : Recipient of the 75th Birthday Medal of Prince Henrik
 : Recipient of the 350th Anniversary Medal of the Royal Danish Life Guards
 : Recipient of the 70th Birthday Medal of Queen Margrethe II
 : Recipient of the Ruby Jubilee Medal of Queen Margrethe II
 : Recipient of the 400th Anniversary Medal of the Guard Hussar Regiment
 : Recipient of the 75th Birthday Medal of Queen Margrethe II
 : Recipient of the Golden Anniversary Medal of Queen Margrethe II and Prince Henrik
 : Recipient of the Prince Henrik's Commemorative Medal
 : Recipient of the 80th Birthday Medal of Queen Margrethe II
 : Recipient of the Golden Jubilee Medal of Queen Margrethe II

Foreign
 : Grand Cross of Order of the Liberator General San Martín
 : Knight Grand Cross of the Order of the Crown
 : Grand Cross of the Order of the White Rose
 : Grand Cross of the Order of Merit of the Federal Republic of Germany, 1st Class
  Greek Royal Family: Dame Grand Cross of the Royal Order of Saints Olga and Sophia
 Recipient of the Commemorative Badge of the Centenary of the Royal House of Greece
 : Grand Cross of the Order of the Falcon
  Iranian Imperial Family: Knight Grand Cordon of the Imperial Order of the Crown
 : Grand Cross of the Order of Merit of the Italian Republic
 : Knight Grand Cross of the Order of Adolphe of Nassau
 : Grand Cross of the Order of the Aztec Eagle
 : Knight Commander of the Order of the Crown
 : Knight Grand Cross of the Order of the Crown
 : Recipient of the Wedding Medal of Princess Beatrix, Princess of Orange and Claus Van Amsberg
 : Knight Grand Cross of the Order of Saint Olav
 : Knight Grand Cross of the Order of Isabella the Catholic
 : Member Grand Cross of the Royal Order of the Polar Star
 : Recipient of the 50th Birthday Badge Medal of King Carl XVI Gustaf
 : Recipient of the Ruby Jubilee Badge Medal of King Carl XVI Gustaf
 : Recipient of the 70th Birthday Badge Medal of King Carl XVI Gustaf
 : Grand Officer of the Order of the Republic
 : Knight of the Decoration of Honour

Awards and patronages

National
 : Chairman of the Joint Committee of Girl Guides in Denmark
 : Protector of the Green Girl Guides
 : Protector of the Danish Guide and Scout Association
 : Patron of the Danish World Association of Girl Guides and Girl Scouts
 : Patron of the Danish Dressage
 : Patron of the Danish International Federation for Equestrian Sports
 : Patron Award of the Danish Warmblood Society
 : Patron of the Alzheimer's Association
 : Honorary Member of the Guild of St George in Denmark

Foreign
 : Honorary Doctorate of the Seoul Women's University
 : Patron of the Olave Baden-Powell Society

Ancestry

References

Citations

Bibliography

External links

 Official web page on Princess Benedikte

|-

1944 births
Living people
House of Glücksburg (Denmark)
House of Sayn-Wittgenstein
Danish princesses
German princesses
Regents of Denmark
Grand Commanders of the Order of the Dannebrog
Recipients of the Cross of Honour of the Order of the Dannebrog
Recipients of the Medal of Merit (Denmark)
Grand Crosses of the Order of the Liberator General San Martin
Grand Crosses of the Order of the Crown (Belgium)
Grand Crosses 1st class of the Order of Merit of the Federal Republic of Germany
Knights Grand Cross of the Order of Merit of the Italian Republic
Grand Crosses of the Order of the Crown (Netherlands)
Knights Grand Cross of the Order of Isabella the Catholic
Commanders Grand Cross of the Order of the Polar Star
World Scout Committee members
20th-century Lutherans
21st-century Lutherans
Danish Lutherans
People from Copenhagen
Recipients of the Bronze Wolf Award
Daughters of kings